This article details longest tennis match records by duration or number of games.
The 1970–1973 introduction of the tiebreak reduced the opportunity for such records to be broken. However, among the four majors, the US Open, Australian Open and Wimbledon (since 2019) use the tiebreak in the final set, while the French Open, through 2021, was the only major to use the advantage set rules in the final set, which allows for an indefinite number of games until one player is ahead by two. A 2022 rule change now requires every Grand Slam tournament, even the Olympics, to use the tiebreak in the final set.

All competitions

Overall

Longest matches by duration

Only two professional competitive matches have lasted longer than seven
hours and 14 matches have lasted longer than six hours.

Longest matches by number of games

Men's singles

The Isner–Mahut match at the 2010 Wimbledon Championships holds the record for the longest tennis match both in time and games played. It lasted for 11 hours and 5 minutes.

Women's singles
The longest women's match (by time) took place at a tournament in Richmond, Virginia, in 1984, when Vicki Nelson took 6 hours, 31 minutes to defeat Jean Hepner 6–4, 7–6(13–11). The match featured a 29-minute, 643-shot rally, the longest in professional tennis history, though no video exists of this point.

Unlike men's singles matches, where Grand Slam events are still played over the best of five sets, all women's matches are now played as the best of three sets. All matches since January 1, 2019 have been checked, but there are likely to be many more from earlier years which have not yet been recognised, especially as qualifying matches in ITF tournaments before that date would normally have been played over the best of three tie-break sets.

Where different sources give durations for a particular match, the shortest elapsed time will be the one noted below.

The longest match consisting of two standard sets and a match tie-break was played in the second qualifying round of a $25,000 ITF tournament in Buenos Aires, Argentina, on January 9, 2023.  Valentina Mutilba defeated Luciana Blatter 6–7(7–9), 7–6(12–10), [10–7]. The official ITF live scoring data recorded the duration as three hours and 44 minutes, but SofaScore and TNNS both recorded three minutes less.

Doubles
Longest doubles matches by time

Longest doubles matches by number of games

Australian Open

Men's singles

Men's doubles

Women's singles

Women's doubles

Mixed doubles

French Open

Men's singles

Men's doubles

Women's singles

Women's doubles

Mixed doubles

Wimbledon

Men's singles
The 2019 Wimbledon
Men's final between Roger Federer and Novak Djokovic lasted 4 hours 57 minutes and is the third longest singles final by time played.

Men's doubles

Women's singles

Women's doubles

Mixed doubles

US Open

Men's singles

Men's doubles

Women's singles

Best-of-five-sets system:

Best-of-three-sets system:

Women's doubles

Mixed doubles

Summer Olympics
 Note: The International Olympic Committee does not recognise records in tennis. Therefore, all the records listed below are unofficial.

Overall

Men's singles
Best-of-three-sets system:

Best-of-five-sets system:

Men's doubles

Women's singles

Women's doubles

Mixed doubles

Davis Cup and Fed Cup

Davis Cup

Fed Cup

Tour Finals

ATP Tour Finals

Best-of-five-sets system:

Best-of-three-sets system:

WTA Tour Finals

Best-of-five-sets system:

Best-of-three-sets system:

See also

 Tennis statistics
 Shortest tennis match records
 Longest tiebreaker in tennis

References

External links
 BBC – Extreme tennis: the demands of a 10-hour game

Tennis records and statistics